James (Jim) Douglas Bagnall (b. 15 February 1949) is a Canadian politician, who was elected to the Legislative Assembly of Prince Edward Island in the 1996 provincial election. Bagnall is married to Eileen (Craig) Bagnall. They have four kids, Douglas, Craig, Tara and Tanya. He represented the electoral district of Montague-Kilmuir as a member of the Progressive Conservative Party. In June 2010, he was named interim leader of the Progressive Conservatives after Olive Crane resigned to run for the party's permanent leadership in the October 2010 convention.

A former retail store owner, Bagnall served on the town council for Montague from 1990 to 1996. He served in the provincial cabinet as Minister of Agriculture, Fisheries and Aquaculture.

References
 

Living people
Members of the Executive Council of Prince Edward Island
People from Kings County, Prince Edward Island
Prince Edward Island municipal councillors
Progressive Conservative Party of Prince Edward Island MLAs
Progressive Conservative Party of Prince Edward Island leaders
21st-century Canadian politicians
1949 births